American rapper Yo Gotti has released 11 studio albums, 22 mixtapes and 57 singles (plus 22 as featured artist), and 5 promotional singles. After several guest appearances, mixtapes and independent releases, he released his major-label debut album Life, in 2003.

Albums

Studio albums

Compilation albums

Mixtapes

Singles

As lead artist

As featured artist

Promotional singles

Other charted songs

Guest appearances

Notes

References

Hip hop discographies
Discographies of American artists
Discography